The West Footscray Football Club is an Australian rules football club that is based at Kevin Shorten Reserve in West Footscray.

The club entered the Footscray District Football League in 1932 and won a premiership in 1934 and again in 1935. West Footscray have won five premierships; four in Division 1 and, most recently, the 2007 Division 2 premiership. The club has 2 senior Men's Teams, a Women's Team (Founded in 2018) and 9 junior teams, including under 15 and 12s girls teams, as well as Auskick junior development.

Notable players
 Marty McDonnell, a defender who played 92 VFL games with Footscray, in a war-interrupted career.
 Laurie Sandilands, a former Footscray captain, who played a total of 164 games with both Footscray and Collingwood.
 Robert McGhie, played juniors at West Footscray in the 1960s before embarking on a 13-year, dual-premiership career in the VFL with Footscray, Richmond, and the South Melbourne Football Clubs.

Honours
 Western Region Football League
 Division One (5): 1934, 1935, 1947, 1970, 1982
 Division Two (1): 1941, 2007

References

External links

 Official Facebook
 Club History

Western Region Football League clubs
Australian rules football clubs in Melbourne
Australian rules football clubs established in 1932
1932 establishments in Australia
Sport in the City of Maribyrnong